Nikolas A. Lalos (born June 25, 1997) is an American football defensive end for the Seattle Sea Dragons of the XFL. He played college football for Dartmouth.

Early life and high school
Lalos grew up in Akron, Ohio and attended St. Vincent–St. Mary High School, where he played basketball and football.

College career
Lalos was a member of the Dartmouth Big Green for four seasons, playing on the junior varsity team as a freshman before lettering in the final three seasons. As a senior, he was named first-team All-Ivy League after recording 35 tackles with a team-high 10 tackles for loss and 5.5 sacks as well as seven passes broken up and an interception, which he returned 22 yards for a touchdown. Lalos finished his collegiate career with 59 tackles, 17.5 tackles for loss, 11 sacks, an interception and a fumble recovery in 24 games played. After his senior season, Lalos played in the 2020 Hula Bowl and was named the defensive MVP of the game after making six tackles with two sacks and a forced fumble.

Professional career

New York Giants
Lalos was signed by the New York Giants as an undrafted free agent on April 25, 2020. He was waived during final roster cuts on September 5, 2020, and signed to the practice squad the next day. Lalos was elevated to the active roster on November 28, 2020, and made his NFL debut the following day against the Cincinnati Bengals in Week 12. He received a Twitter shout-out from fellow St. Vincent–St. Mary High School alum LeBron James on the morning of his first career game. Lalos went on to catch a deflected pass thrown by Bengals' quarterback Brandon Allen for a game-altering interception while playing limited defensive snaps in the 19–17 victory. He was elevated to the active roster again the following week against the Seattle Seahawks and recovered a fumble on a mishandled snap by Seattle's Russell Wilson during the 17–12 win. He reverted to the practice squad after each game. The Giants signed Lalos to their active roster on December 8, 2020.

On August 31, 2021, Lalos was waived by the Giants and re-signed to the practice squad the next day.

He signed a reserve/futures contract with the Giants on January 10, 2022. On August 5, 2022, Lalos was waived.

New Orleans Saints
On August 15, 2022, Lalos signed with the New Orleans Saints. He was waived on August 30. He was re-signed to the practice squad on November 16.

Seattle Sea Dragons
On November 17, 2022, Lalos was drafted by the Seattle Sea Dragons of the XFL.

References

External links 
 Dartmouth Big Green bio
 New York Giants bio

Living people
Players of American football from Akron, Ohio
American football defensive ends
Dartmouth Big Green football players
New Orleans Saints players
New York Giants players
Seattle Sea Dragons players
St. Vincent–St. Mary High School alumni
1997 births